Rhytiphora cinnamomea is a species of beetle in the family Cerambycidae. It was described by Francis Polkinghorne Pascoe in 1859. It is known from Australia.

References

cinnamomea
Beetles described in 1859